José Casanova Mendoza (12 May 1964 – 8 December 1987) was a Peruvian international footballer who played as a midfielder. He was also part of Peru's squad for the 1983 Copa América tournament.

Casanova died in the 1987 Alianza Lima air disaster.

References

External links

1964 births
1987 deaths
Association football midfielders
Peruvian footballers
Peru international footballers
Club Alianza Lima footballers
Victims of aviation accidents or incidents in Peru
Footballers killed in the 1987 Alianza Lima plane crash